Puerto Rico competed in the 2019 Pan American Games which took place in Lima, Peru from July 26 to August 11, 2019.

On June 19, 2019, wrestler Franklin Gómez was named as the country's flag bearer during the opening ceremony.

The Puerto Rico team consisted of 244 athletes.

Originally, Puerto Rico won the gold medal in bowling - men's doubles, though Jean Perez, a member of the bowling team, was tested positive for doping with chlorthalidone, a prohibited diuretic. The Panam Sports Disciplinary Commission announced this positive the day the Lima Games are closed, on 11 August 2019. As a consequence, the Puerto Rican duo loses gold, which passes to the United States. Colombia gets the silver and the bronze goes to the Mexico team.

Medalists

The following Puerto Rican competitors won medals at the games.

Competitors
The following is the list of number of competitors (per gender) participating at the games per sport/discipline.

Archery

Men

Women

Mixed

Baseball

Puerto Rico qualified a men's team of 24 athletes by winning the gold medal at the 2018 Central American and Caribbean Games.

Group A

Basketball

5 × 5
Summary

Men's tournament

Women's tournament

3 × 3
Summary

Bowling

Boxing

Puerto Rico qualified two male boxers.

Men

Canoeing

Sprint

Men

Women

Qualification legend: QF – Qualify to final; SF – Qualify to semifinal

Diving

Men

Equestrian

Puerto Rico qualified one athlete in equestrian.

Jumping

Fencing

Puerto Rico qualified a team of 4 fencers (three men and one woman).

Men
Foil – 3 quotas

Women
Foil – 1 quota

Golf

Puerto Rico qualified one male golfer.

Judo

Men

Women

Sailing

Mixed

Open

Shooting

Men

Women

Mixed

Softball

Puerto Rico qualified a women's team (of 15 athletes) by being ranked in the top five nations at the 2017 Pan American Championships.

Women's tournament

Preliminary round

Semifinals

Final

Surfing

Puerto Rico qualified five surfers (four men and one woman) in the sport's debut at the Pan American Games.

Artistic

Race

Table tennis

Men

Women

Mixed

Taekwondo

Kyorugi (sparring)
Men

Women

Poomsae (forms)

Weightlifting

Puerto Rico qualified five weightlifters (three men and two women).

Men

Women

Wrestling

Men

Women

References

Nations at the 2019 Pan American Games
2019
P